Placidochromis phenochilus is a species of cichlid endemic to the northern parts of Lake Malawi.  This species can reach a length of  TL.

References

phenochilus
Taxa named by Ethelwynn Trewavas
Fish described in 1935
Taxonomy articles created by Polbot